Archibald Leach may refer to:

 Cary Grant (1904–1986), a film actor, born Archibald Leach
 Archie Leach, a fictional character played by John Cleese in the film A Fish Called Wanda
 Archie Leach, a fictional character played by Richard Chamberlain in the TV series Leverage

See also
 Archibald Leech (American football), a Geneva Golden Tornadoes head football coach in 1905
 Archibald Leitch (1865–1939), Scottish architect